Hrant or Harant is an Armenian given name. Among English-speakers it is often treated as a form of the name "Grant”. Notable people with the name include:

 Hrant Alianak, Armenian Canadian actor
 Hrant Bagratyan, prime minister of Armenia
 Hrant Dink, Turkish Armenian journalist
 Hrant Kenkulian, Turkish Armenian oud virtuoso
 Hrant Markarian, Armenian politician
 Hrant Ayvazyan
 Hrant Melkumyan, Armenian chess grandmaster
 Hrant Matevosyan
 Hrant Maloyan
 Hrant Shahinyan
 Hrant Tokhatyan
 Hrant Vardanyan
 Udi Hrant Kenkulian

Armenian masculine given names